The Fujifilm X70 is an APS-C sensor digital compact camera with an 18.5 mm fixed prime lens (28 mm equivalent angle of view (AOV) in 35 mm full frame format). It is part of Fujifilm's X-Series of cameras. It was announced in January 2016 (along with the Fujifilm X-Pro2) and was released on 18 February 2016.

Comparison with other Fujifilm cameras
Reviewers have noted the X70's similarity to the Fujifilm X100T and to the Ricoh GR II. The X70 combines an X-Trans CMOS II sensor with an EXR processor II, and is the smallest of Fujifilm's cameras to be equipped with the company's APS-C sensor. It shares some technology with the Fujifilm X100T (its sensor and auto focus system) but has a wider angle lens with a slower aperture, is smaller, lacks a built in viewfinder and has a tilting and fully upwards articulating touchscreen display.

Key features
16.3 megapixel, APS-C sized X-Trans CMOS II sensor
Tilting and fully upwards articulating touchscreen display
Digital teleconverter – 28 mm / 35 mm / 50mm (equivalent angle of view (AOV) in 35 mm full frame format)
Full HD video / 1080p / 1920 x 1080 at 60p
ISO 200–6400, expandable to 100–51200
1/4000 s (mechanical shutter); 1 s to 1/32000 s (electronic shutter)

Accessories
VF-X21 hot shoe-mountable optical viewfinder
WCL-X70 Wide Conversion Lens

References

External links 
Fujifilm X70 site
Another Fujifilm X70 site

X70
Cameras introduced in 2016